Anne-Marie Gustafsdotter Nenzell (born 29 May 1949) is a retired Swedish middle-distance runner. She placed seventh in the 800 m and eighth in the 1500 m at the 1969 European Championships and competed in the 1500 m event at the 1972 Summer Olympics. Nenzell won national titles over 800 m in 1969–70 and over 1500 m in 1969, and set eight national records in these events in 1969–72. After retiring from competitions she worked as an athletics functionary.

References

1949 births
Living people
Athletes (track and field) at the 1972 Summer Olympics
Olympic athletes of Sweden
Swedish female middle-distance runners
Athletes from Stockholm